John Edward Convey (December 16, 1909 — February 22, 1969) was a Canadian ice hockey left winger. He played in the NHL for the New York Americans between 1931 and 1933. The rest of his career, which lasted from 1929 to 1941, was spent in various minor leagues. He was born in Toronto, Ontario.

Career statistics

Regular season and playoffs

External links
 

1909 births
1969 deaths
Buffalo Bisons (IHL) players
Canadian ice hockey left wingers
New Haven Eagles players
New York Americans players
Ontario Hockey Association Senior A League (1890–1979) players
Pittsburgh Hornets players
Ice hockey people from Toronto
Syracuse Stars (AHL) players
Syracuse Stars (IHL) players
Toronto St. Michael's Majors players
Windsor Bulldogs (1929–1936) players
Canadian expatriate ice hockey players in the United States